Lookin’ to Get Out is a 1982 American comedy film, directed by Hal Ashby and written by Al Schwartz and Jon Voight, who also stars.  The film also stars Ann-Margret and Burt Young. Voight's daughter, Angelina Jolie, then seven years old, makes her acting debut.

Plot
Alex Kovac, playing poker in New York City, drops $10,000 to gamblers Joey and Harry that he can not pay back. Alex persuades pal Jerry Feldman to hop on a plane to Las Vegas with him and try to win $10,000 to pay off the debt.

Finding out that a similarly named Jerry Feldman is a regular there, Jerry is comped $10,000 by the casino, no questions asked. A room and other perks go along with the comp. A waiter named Smitty, an old acquaintance of Alex's, is an expert card-counter, so he is staked to a high-limit blackjack game by the guys.

Patti Warner, a former girlfriend of Alex's, is now the mistress of the casino's boss. Their mutual attraction returns, but trouble follows after a $500,000 victory at the tables, not only from the casino but from Joey and Harry, who have come to Vegas looking to get their money or get even.

Cast
 Jon Voight as Alex Kovac
 Ann-Margret as Patti Warner
 Burt Young as Jerry
 Bert Remsen as Smitty
 Siegfried and Roy as the Magicians
 Samantha Harper as Lilian, Jerry's ex-wife

Voight's seven-year old daughter, Angelina Jolie (credited as Angelina Jolie Voight) made her acting debut by briefly appearing as Voight's character's daughter (Tosh Kovac) near the end of the movie.

Production
The film was Voight's screenwriting debut.

After initial delays, the film started principal photography in May 1980. Production was interrupted for five months due to an actors' strike.

Director Ashby had notorious bouts with the studio and recut the film for himself before it was taken from his hands and recut by the studio. Years later, while speaking at the University of Southern California, Jon Voight discovered that the version of the film which had been shown to the students was not the theatrical version but instead Ashby's original cut (which was considered lost). This was brought to the attention of Warner Home Video who released the Ashby Director's Cut on DVD on June 30, 2009.

Filming took place in Las Vegas, including the MGM Grand Las Vegas and Variety noted in their review the "shameless plugging for the MGM leisure palace and its entertainment shows (particularly Siegfried & Roy's magic acts)."

Release
The film was initially due to be released by United Artists but Lorimar's deal with UA expired before the film was released and Paramount Pictures acquired the film as part of a package to distribute Lorimar product.

The film received poor reviews. Variety called it "an ill-conceived vehicle for actor (and cowriter) Jon Voight to showcase
his character comedy talents in a loose, semi improvised environment." They noted that "Voight and Young are an entertaining team, but presented in an untenable vehicle".

The film was released on October 8, 1982 in 850 theaters and due to its poor performance, Lorimar made a $6.2 million write-off.

See also
 List of films set in Las Vegas

References

External links
 
 
 

1982 films
Films scored by Johnny Mandel
Films directed by Hal Ashby
1982 comedy films
Paramount Pictures films
American comedy films
Films scored by Miles Goodman
Films set in the Las Vegas Valley
Films about gambling
1980s English-language films
1980s American films